Venkatagirikota (also known as V. Kota) is a small town in Chittoor district of the Indian state of Andhra Pradesh. It is the mandal headquarters of Venkatagirikota mandal.

Geography
It has an average elevation of 764 meters (2509 feet) above sea level. The village is very close to Karnataka and Tamil Nadu state borders. and its very fast developing town in chittoor dist, this town is a center point for 3 states and 3 highways passes through
The population of the village primarily consists of all religions.

References 

Villages in Chittoor district
Mandal headquarters in Chittoor district